The 1954–55 Macedonian Republic League was the 11th since its establishment. Metalec Skopje won their first championship title.

Participating teams

Final table

References 
Karovski, Ilija (1996) FK Tikvesh 1930–1995 p. 46, 47, 48

External links
SportSport.ba
Football Federation of Macedonia 

Macedonian Football League seasons
Yugo
3